Čivelj is a village in Bosnia and Herzegovina. It is located in the municipality of Jablanica, Herzegovina-Neretva Canton, Federation of Bosnia and Herzegovina. In 1991, the village had six inhabitants, all of whom were Muslims.

Tourism is solid. Civelj is placed 8 kilometres from Jablanica and it is placed on Jablanica lake. In lake there are 5 types of fishes including the most popular "pastrmka".

The village was found in 1911. by local fishermen. Near Civelj is water gate Jablanica. Local inhabitants are kind and friendly. Civelj is also a good place for camping.

Demographics 
According to the 2013 census, its population was 11, all Bosniaks.

References

See also
List of cities in Bosnia and Herzegovina
Municipalities of Bosnia and Herzegovina

Populated places in Jablanica, Bosnia and Herzegovina